Kenchū Mikkan (顕註密勘) is a commentary on the Kokin Wakashū, a 10th-century waka anthology, attributed to the poet-monk Kenshō but compiled and appended after Kenshō's death by the poet and scholar Fujiwara no Teika.

Overview 
Kenchū Mikkan includes a note by its compiler, the Kamakura-period waka poet Fujiwara no Teika, that it was completed on the 28th day of the third month of Jōkyū 3 (1221). It is a commentary on the Kokin Wakashū, in three kan (books or scrolls). It is a compilation of comments made by the poet-monk Kenshō (ja), who died around 1210.)

Title 
The work is normally known by the title Kenchū Mikkan, but it has a large number of alternate titles, including:
Kokin Wakashū Shō (古今和歌集抄, also written 古今倭歌集抄)
Kokin Hichū Shō (古今秘註抄)
Kenchū Mikkan-shō (顕註密勘抄)

Its title is also abbreviated to Kenchū (顕註), Mikkan (密勘), or simply Kan (勘).

Contents

Textual tradition

Notes

Citations

Works cited

Further reading

External links 
Digitized copies of various copies of the Kenchū Mikkan on the National Institute of Japanese Literature website:
顕注密勘抄 (three-volume manuscript), photographed November 1979
顕注密勘 (three-volume manuscript), photographed February 8, 1978

Kokin Wakashū
Karon (waka)
Fujiwara no Teika
Kamakura-period works